David Ruthven, 2nd Lord Ruthven of Freeland (died April 1701) was a Scottish politician.

The son of Thomas Ruthven, 1st Lord Ruthven of Freeland by his wife Isabel Balfour, he succeeded his father as Lord Ruthven of Freeland in May 1671, and from 1689 to 1692 served as one of the commissioners for exercising the office of Lord High Treasurer of Scotland. He died without issue, and his title passed to his sister Jean.

Lords of Parliament (pre-1707)
02
1701 deaths
Commissioners of the Treasury of Scotland
Year of birth unknown
Members of the Convention of the Estates of Scotland 1689